Lansing Catholic High School is a private, Roman Catholic high school in Lansing, Michigan. It is located in the Roman Catholic Diocese of Lansing.

History
St. Mary High School was established in 1900. Resurrection High School was established in 1935. In 1963, St. Mary High School was closed and Monsignor John W. O'Rafferty High School was opened in Delta Township. At the same time, Resurrection High School was closed and Monsignor John A. Gabriels High School was opened at the corner of W. Saginaw and Marshall St. Due to financial struggles, the two schools were consolidated in 1970 on the Gabriels campus and the school was renamed Lansing Catholic Central High School. It was later again renamed Lansing Catholic High School. The O'Rafferty Campus was sold to Michigan National Bank and became its primary vault and partial headquarters. The site, located on W. Saginaw Hwy, was later in operation as a call center for LaSalle Bank.

In the 2018–19 school year, LCHS instituted the House System as a new way of organizing the school. That year, four houses were established, and every student and staff member was sorted into one of the four. The four houses of Lansing Catholic are Joseph House, Tekakwitha House, De Porres House, and Frassati House. Each house is named after a Saint that is represented in the LCHS chapel. The school's patron is Pope John Paul II.

Dominican Sisters of Mary 
Lansing Catholic High School has several Sisters from the Dominican Sisters of Mary, Mother of the Eucharist as part of the teaching staff.

Performing arts
Lansing Catholic offers a concert and marching band, a jazz band and a choir.  In addition, the band, choir and drama department produces at least two stage shows every school year.

Athletics
The LCHS Cougars are members of the Capital Area Activities Conference.  The school colors are Columbia blue, black and white. As of May 2021, the Athletic Director is Ken Hintze.

Boys cross country won the state championship in 2015. Boys track took the state championship in 2012.  Girls golf brought home the state title 2010–2012.  The boys basketball team were state champs in 2008.  LCHS won state championships in football in 1985 and 2019.  The following MHSAA sanctioned sports are offered:

Fall
Football 
Boys Tennis
Boys Soccer 
Boys & Girls Cross Country 
Girls Volleyball 
Girls Golf 
Girls Swimming & Diving*

Winter
Boys Basketball
Hockey
Boys Swimming & Diving*
Boys & Girls Bowling
Girls Basketball
Competitive Cheer Team
Boys Wrestling

Spring
Baseball
Boys & Girls Track & Field
Boys Golf
Softball
Girls Tennis
Girls Soccer
Boys & Girls Lacrosse*

(Those marked with * are in conjunction with Waverly Senior High School)

Notable alumni
Perry Costello, Umpire 
Dave "Mad Dog" DeMarco, Radio Personality
Mark Murray, 1972, former president of Meijer, Grand Valley State University, and Treasurer of Michigan
Tony Poljan, NFL TE
Cooper Rush, 2012, NFL Quarterback
Craig Rundle, College football coach. Graduated from Gabriel's High School
Jon Cooper (ice hockey), Head coach of the Tampa Bay Lightning

References

External links
School Website

Roman Catholic Diocese of Lansing
Catholic secondary schools in Michigan
Education in Lansing, Michigan
Educational institutions established in 1970
Schools in Ingham County, Michigan
1970 establishments in Michigan